Saccocoma is an extinct genus of crinoids that lived from the Late Jurassic to the Early Cretaceous in Europe and North America.  It contains at least two species.

Sources

 Fossils (Smithsonian Handbooks) by David Ward (Page 170)

External links
Saccocoma in the Paleobiology Database

Roveacrinida
Prehistoric crinoid genera
Jurassic crinoids
Cretaceous crinoids
Prehistoric animals of Europe
Prehistoric echinoderms of North America
Late Jurassic genus first appearances
Early Cretaceous genus extinctions